Blastobasis maroccanella is a moth in the family Blastobasidae. It is found on the Azores, Madeira and in Portugal, Spain and Morocco. It was recently reported from California in the United States.

References

Moths described in 1952
Blastobasis